This is a list of years in Syria.

20th century
 Syrian Republic gained independence from France in 1944, later transforming into Syrian Arab Republic in the 1960s.

21st century

See also
 Timeline of Syrian history
2010s in Syria political history

Cities in Syria
 Timeline of Aleppo
 Timeline of Damascus
 Timeline of Hama
 Timeline of Latakia

 
Syria history-related lists
Syria